Drew Stone is an American film director, producer, film editor, author and musician. His works include music videos, commercials, documentary films and television.

He played an active role in the early stages of the New York hardcore and Boston hardcore punk scene. He was the co-founder and lead singer of The Mighty C.O.'s of Boston, Massachusetts and The High & The Mighty of New York City. Stone is also known for his career as the front man for New York City's Antidote since 1984 as well as playing guitar and singing for The Drew Stone Hit Squad. Since 2020, he is the host of the live video streaming show The New York Hardcore Chronicles LIVE!.

Early life 

A native New Yorker, Stone was born in Queens and raised in Manhattan and The Bronx. He studied acting at Emerson College in Boston, Massachusetts. His father, Arny Stone, was a filmmaker who won an Academy Award for his film, The Critic, starring Mel Brooks.

Musical career 
In 1981 while attending Emerson College, Stone became heavily involved in the local Boston Hardcore music scene and became the lead singer of The Mighty C.O.'s. Upon returning to New York City in 1983 he formed The High & The Mighty and a year later joined hardcore band Antidote. In 2022 Antidote NYHC with Stone as the frontman was rebranded Incendiary Device (I.D.). His contributions to the hardcore punk scene were documented in the books American Hardcore: A Tribal History and NYHC New York Hardcore 1980–1990  In 2013 he formed The Drew Stone Hit Squad which plays punk, hardcore, traditional and americana in an acoustic format.

Film career 
After working for years as a crew member on film sets in a variety of roles in 1992 Stone formed New York City-based film Production Company, Stone Films NYC and produced numerous music videos (Onyx, Type O Negative, Biohazard, Kings X, Insane Clown Posse) by himself and produced / directed with his brother Evan B. Stone as "The Stone Brothers" (Vanilla Ice, Channel Zero, Stuck Mojo). He has directed videos for Agnostic Front, Sick of It All, Fury of Five and Madball.  He is a four-time X-Tremmy award winner with his Urban Street-Bike Warriors series of extreme sports films and director of the MTV True Life episode "I Live To Ride," which exposed the extreme sport of motorcycle stunt riding to millions worldwide. In 2006 he created the Urban Street-Bike Warriors: Black Sheep Squadron Tour.

He directed and edited All Ages: The Boston Hardcore Film., a documentary film on the influential early Boston hardcore scene which focuses on aspects of the community and culture. The film debuted at the Independent Film Festival of Boston 2012 and was released on DVD in June of that year. The film features interviews, archival footage and the music of Boston's early hardcore bands including Deep Wound, DYS, Gang Green, Impact Unit, Jerry's Kids, Negative FX, SS Decontrol, The Freeze and The F.U.'s. Also featured in the film are interviews with renowned author Michael Patrick MacDonald ("Easter Rising", "All Souls"), actress Christine Elise McCarthy, Thrasher Magazine editor Jake Phelps, American Hardcore director Paul Rachman, and Newbury Comics owner Michael Dreese.

Stone went on to direct, produce, write and edit Who the Fuck Is That Guy? The Fabulous Journey of Michael Alago which profiles the turbulent life of A & R man Michael Alago. The film includes interviews with James Hetfield, Lars Ulrich and Kirk Hammett of Metallica, Cyndi Lauper, Rob Zombie, Phil Anselmo and John Lydon. The New York Hardcore Chronicles Film and later The New York Hardcore Chronicles Film 1.5. which both spotlight the New York Hardcore scene and feature Roger Miret of Agnostic Front, Ray Cappo of Youth of Today, Craig Setari of Sick of It All were both released soon after.

In 2020 Stone followed his passion for music and adventure and traveled to Israel to direct The Jews and The Blues. The film features the musicians Gal Nisman, Lazer Lloyd, Gili Yalo, Yaron Ben Ami and Yemen Blues.

Discography 
1984 – The High & The Mighty "Crunch On" Demo (Vocals) 
1989 – Antidote "Return 2 Burn" (Vocals) Metropolis Records
1990 – Antidote "Viva Los Pendejos" (Vocals) Music For Nations
1994 – Biohazard "State Of The World Address" (Background Vocals) Warner Brothers Records
1994 – Dog Eat Dog "If These Are Good Times" (Background Vocals) Roadrunner Records
1996 – Antidote / The High & The Mighty  "The A7 & Beyond" (Vocals) Grand Theft Audio
1999 – Nucleus "F.T.W." (Guitar, Vocals) Century Media
1999 – Biohazard "New World Disorder" (Background Vocals) Mercury Records
2012 – Antidote "No Peace in our Time" (Vocals) Bridge Nine Records
2014 – The High & The Mighty "Crunch On" (Vocals) Radio Raheem Records
2014 – Sick Of It All "Last Act Of Defiance" (Background Vocals) Century Media
2017 – Antidote "The Rock Years" (Vocals) Old School Metal Records
2017 – Antidote "Deadly Rain" (Vocals) Matinee Book 7" compilation Radio Raheem Records
2018 – The Drew Stone Hit Squad "I Still Love Living In The City" (Vocals, Guitar) Independently released
2019 – Sick Of It All "Wake the Sleeping Dragon!" (Background Vocals) Century Media
2021 – Antidote NYHC "Scarred" A7 Back To The New York Hardcore Roots New York Hardcore Compilation (Vocals) Pitchfork NY Hardwear
2021 – Antidote NYHC "Divided State" Strength Thru Unity A Conne Island Benefit Compilation (Vocals) Unity Worldwide Records
2021 – Antidote NYHC "If The Kids Are United" Fan Brawl Oi 2 The World Compilation Vol. 4 (Vocals) Oi 2 The World
2021 – Antidote NYHC "Scarred" E.P. (Vocals) Unity Worldwide Records
In Production - Incendiary Device (Self Titled) (Vocals)

Filmography 

1996 – Sepultura "Third World Chaos" (Producer)
1997 – Biohazard "Chaos Ensues"
2000 – 12'oclock "NYC Street-Bike Outlaws A Film About The Life"
2001 – Urban Street-Bike Warriors
2002 – J.C. Leyendecker – The Great American Illustrator (Line Producer)
2002 – Urban Street-Bike Warriors #2 "Black Sheep Squadron"
2002 – Urban Street-Bike Warriors "Smashes Bashes and Crashes"
2002 – Outlaw Street Cars: Death Or Glory
2002 – Urban Street-Car Warriors
2003 – Urban Street-Bike Warriors #3 "Don't Forget the Struggle, Don't Forget the Streets"
2004 – MTV "True Life" Season 9, episode 13 "I Live To Ride"
2004 – Urban Street-Bike Warriors Tony D. Freestyle "Respect the Hustle"
2005 – Urban Street-Bike Warriors "Worldwide Live"
2006 – Passion And Brotherhood
2007 – Mike Metzger "Godfather of Freestyle Motorcross" (Associate Producer)
2012 – All Ages: The Boston Hardcore Film
2017 – Who the Fuck Is That Guy? The Fabulous Journey of Michael Alago
2017 – The New York Hardcore Chronicles Film
2018 – Muhammad Ali "Me Whee" (Executive Producer)
2018 – The New York Hardcore Chronicles Film 1.5
2021 – Drew Stone's Hardcore Chronicles (Series, 4 Episodes)
2022 – The Jews and The Blues
 In Production – Drew Stone's Cinematic and Music Walking Tour of NYC. (Working Title)

References

External links 

American documentary film directors
American punk rock musicians
Emerson College alumni
People from Queens, New York
Year of birth missing (living people)
Living people
Film directors from New York City